The 1995 World Cup of Golf took place 9–12 November at the Mission Hills Golf Club in Shenzhen, Dongguan, Guangdong, China. It was the 41st World Cup. The tournament was a 72-hole stroke play team event with each team consisting of two players from a country. The combined score of each team determined the team results. Individuals also competed for the International Trophy. The prize money totaled $1,500,000 with $400,000 going to the winning pair and $100,000 to the top individual. The United States team of Fred Couples and Davis Love won, for a record fourth time in a row with the same players in the team, by 14 strokes over the Australia team of Brett Ogle and Robert Allenby. Love took the International Trophy after a playoff over Hisayuki Sasaki of Japan.

Teams

Scores
Team

International Trophy

Love won in a playoff with a par on the 5th extra hole.

Sources:

References

World Cup (men's golf)
Golf tournaments in China
World Cup golf
World Cup golf
World Cup golf